CAS may refer to:

Organisations
 California Academy of Sciences, a major natural history museum and center for scientific research
 Career Academies of Seminole, a program run by Pinellas County Schools in Florida
 Casualty Actuarial Society, a professional society of actuaries in the United States
 Centre for Astrophysics and Supercomputing, a research center at Swinburne University in Australia
 Chemical Abstracts Service, a division of the American Chemical Society which produces bibliographic and chemistry databases
 Chinese Academy of Sciences, the national academy for the natural sciences of China
 Combined Associated Schools, an association of private schools in Sydney, Australia
 Contemporary Art Society, UK
 Contemporary Art Society (Australia)
Contemporary Art Society, Adelaide, later the Contemporary Art Centre of South Australia
 Contemporary Arts Society, Canada
 Court of Arbitration for Sport, an international arbitration body set up to settle disputes related to sports
 Children's Aid Society, a private charity in New York City
 Children's Aid Society (Ontario), a Canadian government organization
 Christchurch Adventist School, a Seventh-day Adventist school in New Zealand
 Civil Aid Service, a Hong Kong Civil Aid agency
 Cinema Audio Society, an association of sound professionals in the motion picture and television industry
 Council for the Advancement of Standards in Higher Education, a consortium of professional student development organizations in higher education
 Connecticut Association of Schools, the governing body for secondary school athletics and other competitions in Connecticut, US
 Czech Academy of Sciences, formerly Academy of Sciences of the Czech Republic
 Český atletický svaz, Czech Athletics Federation

Computing
 CAS latency (column address strobe or column address select), a latency in reading computer memory
 Central Authentication Service, a single sign-on protocol
 Cloud Analytic Services, a server that provides the cloud-based, run-time environment for data management and analytics with SAS (software)
 Code Access Security in the Microsoft .NET framework
 Compare-and-swap, a special CPU instruction, an atomic instruction used in multithreading to achieve synchronization
 Computer algebra system, a software program that facilitates symbolic mathematics
 Conditional access system, a technology used in set-top boxes to allow conditional viewing of TV channels
 Content-addressable storage, a data storage mechanism
 Copyright Alert System, also known as the 'six strikes' program
 Cycle-accurate simulator, a computer program that simulates a microarchitecture in a cycle-accurate manner

Science and medicine
 Calcium sulfide (CaS), a chemical compound
 Coronary artery spasm (CAS)
 Carotid artery stenting, endovascular surgery of the carotid artery 
 Cassiopeia (constellation) (Cas), standard astronomical abbreviation
 Cells Alive System
 Chemical Abstracts Service, a division of the American Chemical Society which produces bibliographic and chemistry databases
 CAS Registry Number, unique numerical identifiers for chemical substances
 Cognitive Assessment System, an academic assessment test given to children
 Complex adaptive system, special cases of complex systems
 Computer Aided Surgery (journal)
 Computer-assisted surgery, use computer technology in surgery
 Critical animal studies, an interdisciplinary field in the humanities and social sciences
 Hartley kernel, which also is known as the cosine and sine function
 Cis-abienol synthase, an enzyme
 CRISPR-associated (Cas) proteins, involved in the prokaryotic immune system and genome editing
CAS parameters, an image analysis method typically used in astronomy

Entertainment and sports
 Cigarettes After Sex, an American ambient pop band
 Classic Arts Showcase, an American television channel promoting the fine arts
 Cowboy action shooting, a competitive shooting sport

Military
 Chief of the Air Staff, the professional head of the air force in some Commonwealth nations
 Close air support, a military tactic whereby aircraft are utilized to support friendly forces
 Combat armor suit, a specialized suit that provides powered armor
 Cost Accounting Standards, accounting requirements for larger defense and government contractors (United States)

Aerospace
 Calibrated airspeed, the airspeed shown by an airspeed indicator
 Covenant Aviation Security, LLC, a company that provides security services to the aviation industry
 Crew-alerting system, the cockpit computer that issues system warnings to pilots
 Casablanca–Anfa Airport (IATA code)

Transport
 Castleton railway station, Manchester, England (National Rail station code)
 Chicago, Attica and Southern Railroad, a former line in the American states of Indiana and Illinois

Other uses
 Certificate of Advanced Study, a postgraduate certificate
 Channel-associated signaling, in telecommunications
 Citizens Advice Scotland, the umbrella organisation for Citizens Advice Bureaux in Scotland
 Clark Ashton Smith (1893–1961), American author and artist
 Collision avoidance system, an automobile safety system
 Controlled American source, a placeholder term used by the Central Intelligence Agency in classified documents to avoid disclosure of specific locations, operations, activities, or individuals
 Controlled atmosphere stunning, a method for slaughtering animals
 Creativity, activity, service, the community service aspect of the International Baccalaureate Diploma Programme

See also
 
 
 Cas (disambiguation)
 CASE (disambiguation)